Lazovsky District is an administrative and municipal district (raion), one of the twenty-two in Primorsky Krai, Russia. It is located in the southeast of the krai on the eastern slopes of the Sikhote-Alin mountain range and its southern spurs. Its administrative center is the rural locality (a selo) of Lazo. Population:  The population of Lazo accounts for 24.1% of the district's total population.

Geography
24.8% of the district's territory is occupied by the Lazovsky Nature Reserve, which was established between 1935-1957 and has an area of 121,000 ha (1,210km2). The main river in the district is the Kiyevka.

History
The district was split from Olginsky District on March 4, 1941 as Sokolovsky District, and was given its present name on August 26, 1949 after the administrative center was moved to Lazo from the settlement of Sudzukhe.

Economy
Most of the population is involved in the coastal and oceanic fishing, mariculture development, and fish and sea products processing. JSC Preobrazhenskaya Trawling Fleet Base and Valentin Fish Factory operate in the district.

Among the district's mineral deposits are tin and gold deposits. The thermal mineral waters are of great importance. Chistovodnoye, the krai's specialized hospital, where illness of locomotor apparatus and skin diseases are treated, is located on the radon springs. Two lakes with medical mud are also used.

Transportation
No railways operate on the territory of the district. Communication with the outer world is by auto and sea transport.

References

Notes

Sources

Districts of Primorsky Krai
States and territories established in 1941